John Chesterfield Woodson (December 25, 1823 – April 24, 1875) was a nineteenth-century American lawyer and politician from Virginia.

Early and family life
Woodson was born on Christmas Day, 1823 in Richmond to Jacob Woodson and Elizabeth Brown. He graduated from the University of Virginia, attending 1848–51. He married Sarah E. Amiss in Highland County, Virginia on November 16, 1848, and they had children Edmund (b. 1849), Andrew Dyer (b. 1851), Katherine Elizabeth (1854-1944), Frank (b. 1857), Robert Lee (1862-1933), Thomas Chapman(b. 1868) and John H. (b. 1869)

Career

In 1847, Woodson moved to Harrisonburg, Virginia, practiced law and was elected Commonwealth's Attorney there.

During the American Civil War, Woodson was elected to represent Rockingham County in the House of Delegates alongside Charles Grattan and John H. Hopkins, but resigned and S.A. Coffman was elected in his place.

As Virginia's Presidential Reconstruction began, Rockingham County voters again elected Woodson  to the General Assembly for the session from 1865 to 1867, and he served alongside W.G. Thompson and H.B. Harnsberger.

In 1867, Rockingham County voters elected Conservatives Woodson and Jacob N. Liggett to represent them in the Virginia Constitutional Convention of 1868.

Death
John C. Woodson died in Harrisonburg, Virginia on April 24, 1875, and was buried in Woodbine cemetery.

References

Bibliography

1823 births
1875 deaths
19th-century American politicians
19th-century American lawyers
Virginia lawyers
Members of the Virginia House of Delegates
Politicians from Richmond, Virginia
University of Virginia alumni
People of Virginia in the American Civil War
Lawyers from Richmond, Virginia
People from Harrisonburg, Virginia